Leopoldo Marenco (Nov. 8, 1831 – April 30, 1899) was an Italian dramatic poet, now known as a librettist.

Life

Born at Ceva, his father was Carlo Marenco. Like his father he held a government post under the Treasury Department, one which took him to Sardinia.

In 1860 he became Professor of Latin literature at Bologna University, and later occupied a similar chair at Milan University. In 1871 he retired to Turin.

Works

His plays in verse, written after 1860, are more notable for their lyrical qualities than for dramatic technique. Among them are "Celeste", "Tempeste alpine", "Marcellina", "Il falconiere di Pietra Ardena", "Adelasia" "La famiglia", "Carmela" "Piccarda Donati", "Saffo", "Rosalinda", etc. Subjects from modern and medieval history were treated by him, and he followed his father's example in drawing from Dante.

References

Attribution
 The entry cites:
Collection of his plays, Teatro di Leopoldo Marenco (Turin, 1884)

External links
 

1831 births
1899 deaths
Italian poets
Italian male poets
Italian dramatists and playwrights
Italian male dramatists and playwrights
19th-century poets
19th-century Italian dramatists and playwrights
19th-century Italian male writers
People from Ceva